Curse of the Royal Harem (Traditional Chinese: 萬凰之王; literally "The King Among Ten Thousand Phoenixes") is a 2011 Hong Kong period drama produced by TVB under executive producer Chong Wai-kin. The 45-minute episodes aired from 31 October to 4 December 2011, in a total of 27 episodes in Hong Kong and 31 episodes for the overseas audience. Its stars Jessica Hsuan, Myolie Wu, Sunny Chan, 
Nancy Wu and Joel Chan. It is one of three grand TVB productions used to celebrate the channel's 44th anniversary, the other two being Super Snoops and Forensic Heroes III.

The drama is Hong Kong's fourth highest-rating serial drama of 2011.

Summary
Set in the mid-1800s Qing Dynasty, Curse of the Royal Harem is loosely based on the reign of the Daoguang Emperor of China and tells of the drama and romantic intrigue in the court's Manchurian royal harem.

Yee-lan, the Consort Tsuen (Jessica Hsuan) was the new wife of Emperor Do-kwong (Sunny Chan)'s elder brother. However, Do-kwong's brother was missing after a battle and his body was never found. Empress Dowager Kung-chee (Gigi Wong) was devastated that she lost her beloved son and saw Yee-lan, as an ominous woman and wanted her dead. Because Do-kwong was already in love with Yee-lan, since he was young, he chose to save her by making Yee-lan, as his new concubine, which angered his wife, Empress Hao-sun (Myolie Wu). Partnering up with Empress Dowager, the two vowed to eradicate Yee-lan, using many different schemes to harm her. As Yee-lan, wanted to protect herself, she did not hesitate to battle the Empress to the end. During their battle, Yee-lan, accidentally discovered a major plot happening in the royal harem. Who is behind this big plot? Who will be the winner in this intense battle in the royal harem?

Cast and characters
Character names are in Cantonese romanisation.

Main cast

Minor characters

Viewership ratings

Awards and nominations

My AOD Favourite Awards 2011
Won: My Favourite Actress in a Leading Role (Myolie Wu)
Won: My Favourite Top 15 Drama Characters (Myolie Wu)
Nominated: My Favourite Drama Series 
Nominated: My Favourite Drama Theme Song (Kok On Tin Ming (各安天命) by Susanna Kwan)

45th TVB Anniversary Awards 2011
Won: Best Actress in a Leading Role (Myolie Wu)
Won: Best Improved Female Artiste (Sire Ma)
Won: Best Supporting Actor (Ben Wong)
Nominated: Best Drama
Nominated: Best Actor (Sunny Chan)
Nominated: Best Actress (Jessica Hsuan)
Nominated: Best Supporting Actress (Gigi Wong)

International Broadcast
  - Fairchild TV
  - 8TV (Malaysia)
  - Vinh Long Television Station Channel (THVL)

References

External links
TVB.com Curse of the Royal Harem - Official Website 

TVB dramas
2011 Hong Kong television series debuts
2011 Hong Kong television series endings
Television series set in the Qing dynasty